Dendrobium crassum, commonly known as the tableland feather orchid, is a species of epiphytic orchid that is endemic to tropical North Queensland. It has cylindrical, dark reddish brown pseudobulbs, up to three thick, leathery leaves and up to ten white flowers with purplish markings on the labellum.

Description 
The sides lobes are erect and pointed and the middle lobe is pointed and has a yellow ridge along its midline. Flowering occurs from July to September.

Taxonomy and naming
The tableland feather orchid was first formally described in 2006 by David Jones, Bruce Gray and Mark Clements from a plant collected near Herberton. It was given the name Tropilis crassa and the description was published in Australian Orchid Research. In 2014, Julian Shaw changed the name to Dendrobium crassum. The specific epithet (crassum) is a Latin word meaning "thick", "fat" or "stout", referring to the thick pseudobulbs, relative to those of the similar Dendrobium angustum.

Distribution and habitat
Dendrobium crassum grows on old forest oak (Allocasuarina torulosa) trees in moist open forest. It occurs on the Atherton Tableland.

References

crassum
Endemic orchids of Australia
Orchids of Queensland
Plants described in 2006